Carlos Machado may refer to:
Carlos Machado (fighter), Brazilian jiu-jitsu
Carlos Machado (table tennis) (born 1980), Spanish table tennis player